"Ride On, Baby" is a song by English rock band the Rolling Stones. It was written by Mick Jagger and Keith Richards in 1965. It was first released as a single by Chris Farlowe in October 1966 and reached No. 31 on the British charts. The Rolling Stones' own version appeared a few months later on Flowers, an album released only in the US in June 1967. It was recorded during the Aftermath sessions in December 1965.

Personnel

According to authors Philippe Margotin and Jean-Michel Guesdon, except where noted:

The Rolling Stones
Mick Jagger vocals
Keith Richards backing vocals, lead guitar, autoharp
Brian Jones rhythm guitar, harpsichord, marimba, koto (inaudible)
Bill Wyman bass
Charlie Watts drums, bongos

Additional musician
Jack Nitzsche piano

Chris Farlowe version

British singer Chris Farlowe recorded a version of "Ride On, Baby", produced by Mick Jagger, which was released in October 1966, almost 9 months before the Rolling Stones version. Despite the success of its predecessor "Out of Time", which reached number one, "Ride On Baby" did not even breach the top twenty, peaking at number 31 for two weeks in late 1966. It became his penultimate single release to reach the top 40, the later being "Handbags and Gladrags" in 1967. The track is included on his album The Art of Chris Farlowe.

References

Sources 

 
 

1966 singles
1966 songs
Baroque pop songs
The Rolling Stones songs
Songs written by Jagger–Richards
Immediate Records singles
Chris Farlowe songs